Regulator of G-protein signaling 5 is a protein that in humans is encoded by the RGS5 gene.

The regulator of G protein signaling (RGS) proteins are signal transduction molecules that have structural homology to SST2 of Saccharomyces cerevisiae and EGL-10 of Caenorhabditis elegans. Multiple genes homologous to SST2 are present in higher eukaryotes. RGS proteins are involved in the regulation of heterotrimeric G proteins by acting as GTPase activators.

Interactions
RGS5 has been shown to interact with GNAO1, GNAI2 and GNAI3.

References

Further reading